Karl Kruuda (born 31 December 1992) is an Estonian rally driver.

Rally career
Kruuda debuted in the World Rally Championship at the 2010 Jordan Rally, finishing in 22nd place. In the 2010 World Rally Championship season, he drove Suzuki Swift S1600. His best result of the year was 2nd place in Junior World Rally Championship at the 2010 Rally de Portugal.

Kruuda drove Škoda Fabia S2000 and Ford Fiesta S2000 in the 2011 World Rally Championship season.

He took his first WRC point in the 2014 Rally Finland, finishing in 10th place. The same year Kruuda also won Finnish Rally Championship.

In 2016, Kruuda signed for DMACK World Rally Team.

Personal life
His father is businessman Oliver Kruuda.

Racing record

WRC results

JWRC results

SWRC results

WRC 2 results

WRC-3 results

IRC results

ERC results

References

External links

 
 Karl Kruuda career summary at eWRC-results.com

1992 births
Living people
Estonian rally drivers
World Rally Championship drivers
Sportspeople from Tallinn
European Rally Championship drivers